Uwanda Game Reserve,  also known as Uwanda Rukwa Game Reserve, is a reserve of the Rukwa Valley of southwestern Tanzania. It is an extension of Katavi National Park and covers an area of 4100 square kilometres. It includes almost half of Lake Rukwa. This reserve was established in 1971.

Over 400 species of birds have been recorded in the reserve.

References

Protected areas of Tanzania
Geography of Rukwa Region